The Nest, also known as The Bewailing, is a 2021 American horror film directed by James Suttles, starring Sarah Navratil, Kevin Patrick Murphy, Maple Suttles, Drez Ryan, Dee Wallace, Blaque Flowers, Anna Lynn Holleman and Penny Munroe.

Cast
 Sarah Navratil as Beth
 Kevin Patrick Murphy as Jack
 Maple Suttles as Meg
 Drez Ryan as Ashe
 Dee Wallace as Marissa
 Blaque Flowers as Nick
 Anna Lynn Holleman as Mrs. Jean
 Penny Munroe as Billie
 Piper Suttles as Child at the Window

Release
The film received a wide Digital, Cable, and DVD release on 29 July 2021.

Reception
Paul Mount of Starburst rated the film 4 stars out of 5, calling it a "haunting and sometimes flesh-crawling experience enlivened by some pleasing practical visual effects and a sense of ambiguity in relation to the nature and purpose of the parasite creature itself." Jonathan W. Hickman of the Newnan Times-Herald rated the film 6 out of 10, calling it "compelling and thoroughly unsettling". Alix Turner of Horror Obsessive wrote a positive review of the film.

Alain Elliot of Nerdly rated the film 2 stars out of 5, writing that it "falls into the ‘what could have been’ category and never lives up to its promise of a twisted but intriguing body horror."

References

External links
 
 

American horror films
2021 horror films